"My Fantasy" is a 1989 single written by Gene Griffin and Teddy Riley.

Background
The single featured Guy on vocals and was featured the 1989 film, Do the Right Thing, directed by Spike Lee. It was released as a single at the same time the band's debut album was having its singles released. It samples "Raw" by Big Daddy Kane.

Chart performance
The single reached the number one spot on the Hot Black Singles chart for one week and number sixty-two on the Hot 100 and was Teddy Riley's most successful release on both charts, and was Guy's only number-one to date.

Samples
Ice Cube sampled the '123 swing it' of the 12" version, making a direct reference 'and you can new jack swing on my nuts'.

References

1989 singles
Songs written for films
1989 songs